The Windsor Lancers women's ice hockey program represents the University of Windsor in the OUA conference of U Sports.

History
Debuting as the Lancers head coach in 2009-10, Jim Hunter enjoyed a sterling season. With the Lancers reaching the OUA Semi-Finals, the second half of the season resulted in a sparkling 9-2 conference mark, highlighted by a defeat of the #2 ranked Laurier Golden Hawks in the regular season finale. Finishing the 2010-11 season with 15 wins, compared to 11 losses and one tie, the Lancers reached the CIS Top Ten rankings for the first time ever. 

Reaching 14 wins in 2013-14, including eight losses and two ties, the Lancers 85 goals in merely 24 games established themselves as the highest scoring team in the OUA, and third overall in the nation. Jenny MacKnight would clinch the OUA scoring title with an impressive 40 points, also earning the OUA Player of the Year Award and a spot on the Canadian Interuniversity Sport All-Canadian Team, respectively. Taking place on home ice at South Windsor Arena, Jenny McKnight recorded a hat trick during a convincing 6-1 victory over the Brock Badgers on November 23, 2014. With the performance, MacKnight reached the milestone of 100 career points. 

With a 14-6-4 mark in 2014-15, the second consecutive season of 14 wins, it resulted in the best winning percentage in program history, simultaneously earning their sixth straight playoff appearance. During the 2016-17 season, Jim Hunter reached his 100th career victory. That season saw Krystin Lawrence become the second player in program history to capture the OUA Most Valuable Player Award. 

During the OUA/U SPORTS hiatus due to the ongoing COVID-19 pandemic, Windsor Lancer women's hockey player Devynn Dion starred as an 'acting double' for the lead actress portraying the character, Maya, in the new Disney+ series The Mighty Ducks: Game Changers which premiered in March 2021.

Season-by-season Record

Season team scoring champion

Team captains
2014-15: Kayla Dodson 
2015-16: Jillian Rops and Erinn Noseworthy 
2018-19: Rachel Chantler (captain), Ashley Maitre, Molly Jenkins and Alix Reiter (assistant captains)

International
Jenny MacKnight : 2015 Winter Universiade
Bree Polci : 2015 Winter Universiade
Jim Hunter  2015 Winter Universiade Assistant coach

Awards and honours

University honours
2017 University of Windsor Athlete of the Year (female): Krystin Lawrence
2020 Captain's Trophy (female): Ashley Maitre

OUA Awards
Pat Hennessy, 2002-03 OUA Coach of the Year Western Division  
Katie Clubb, 2002-03 OUA Rookie of the Year Western Division
Jenny MacKnight, 2013-14 OUA scoring champion

OUA Player of the Year
Jenny MacKnight, 2013-14 OUA Player of the Year
Krystin Lawrence, 2016-17 OUA Player of the Year

OUA Forward of the Year
Jenny MacKnight, 2013-14
Krystin Lawrence, 2015-16
Krystin Lawrence 2016-17

OUA All-Stars
Krystin Lawrence 2017 OUA First Team All-Star
Natalie Barrette 2017 OUA Second Team All-Star

All-Canadians
Jenny MacKnight, 2013-14 CIS All-Canadian

Lancers in professional hockey

References

U Sports women's ice hockey teams
Ice hockey, women's
Women in Ontario